3,3'-Dinitrobisphenol A is an organic compound with the formula (HO(O2N)C6H3)2C(CH3)2.  It is a yellow-orange solid prepared by nitration of bisphenol A

Carcinogenicity
It has been proposed that dinitrobisphenol A might be formed in vivo by peroxynitrite mediated oxidations of bisphenol A and that it may exhibit higher toxicity than BPA itself. 3,3'-Dinitrobisphenol A is found to be genotoxic in male ICR mice on a micronucleus test. Its estrogenic potential is not known however it has shown some binding to estrogen-related receptor gamma to an extent.

See also
 Bisphenol A
 Tetrabromobisphenol A

References

2,2-Bis(4-hydroxyphenyl)propanes
Nitro compounds